Erzsébet Polgár is a Hungarian former professional tennis player.

Polgár, who won national singles championships in 1964 and 1968, featured in three editions of the French Open. She competed in a Federation Cup tie for Hungary in 1969, losing her singles rubber to Canada's Faye Urban in three sets.

See also
List of Hungary Fed Cup team representatives

References

External links
 
 

Year of birth missing (living people)
Living people
Hungarian female tennis players
20th-century Hungarian women